The following is a list of notable events and releases that happened in 1995 in music in South Korea.

Debuting and disbanded in 1995

Debuting
Ahn Trio
R.ef
Turbo

Solo debuts
Im Chang-jung
Jung Jae-hyung
Tiger JK
Kim Kyung-ho
Kim Sung-jae
Ryu Si-won

Reformed groups
Sinawe

Disbandments
Deux

Releases in 1995

January

February

March

April

May

June

July

August

September

October

November

December

Deaths
Kim Sung-jae-(aged 23) singer and rapper (Deux (1993-1995))

References